The canton of Saint-Amand-les-Eaux is an administrative division of the Nord department, northern France. It was created at the French canton reorganisation which came into effect in March 2015. Its seat is in Saint-Amand-les-Eaux.

It consists of the following communes:

Bousignies
Brillon
Bruille-Saint-Amand
Château-l'Abbaye
Flines-lès-Mortagne
Hasnon
Hélesmes
Lecelles
Maulde
Millonfosse
Mortagne-du-Nord
Nivelle
Raismes
Rosult
Rumegies
Saint-Amand-les-Eaux
Sars-et-Rosières
Thun-Saint-Amand
Wallers

References

Cantons of Nord (French department)